Teenage marriage is the union of two adolescents, ranging from ages 13 to 19. Many factors contribute to teenage marriage such as love, teenage pregnancy, religion, security, wealth, family, peer pressure, arranged marriage, economical and/or political reasons, social advancement, and cultural reasons. Studies have shown that teenage married couples are often less advantageous, may come from broken homes, may have little education, and work low status jobs in comparison with those that marry after adolescence.

A majority of teenage marriages may suffer from complications, with many ending in divorce. In the United States, half of teenage marriages dissolve within 15 years of the marriage.  The rate of teenage marriage is on a decreasing trend, perhaps due to many new options for choice that are available to those that may be considering teenage marriage.

In the 21st century, teenage marriage is largely unrecognized or illegal in most countries, as most laws classify it as child abuse. Teenage marriage continues to be most prevalent in culturally or geographically isolated parts of the world, and it seems to be decreasing in areas where modern ideas of education are prevalent within the population.

Background
The legal status of circumstances surrounding teenage marriage varies from one geographical area or chronological era to the next.  Marriage has often been used as a tool to create allegiances or agreements, rather than an emotional union between two people. Almost every country has a legal minimum age for marriage, which can range from 12 in some Latin American countries, to 22 in China.  The age requirement is most commonly 16 for women, and 18 for men.   Despite laws concerning the age of marriage, tradition may usually take precedence, and marriage can continue to occur at younger ages.  In many African and Asian continent countries, as much as two-thirds of teenage women are or have been married.  In many nations, marriage of a young daughter could ease economic situations within the family, or alleviate concerns over illegitimate children, considered a dishonor to the family in some cultures. However, younger brides can often suffer physical and/or psychological damage, according to a UNICEF report.

Historically, most marriages in historic Western culture have had a later age of marriage and an emphasis on the nuclear family. The percentage of women ages 15–19 who are married in the United States is 3.9%, while in the Democratic Republic of the Congo the percentage is 74%. In the U.S., teenage marriages show to have declined significantly after the mid-20th century, but experienced resurgence in the 1990s, according to the U.S. Census Bureau. Census data from 2000 show that 4.5% of U.S. 15- to 19-year-olds were married, up from 3.4% in 1990. While an increase of almost 50%, it was still far below the 9.5% recorded in 1950.

History

Pre-20th century 
 According to a study of U.S. census data, in 1890 there were 9.7 percent of teen girls and 0.5 percent of teen boys between the ages of 15 and 19 years who had been married at some time.

20th century

1940s–1950s 
 After the Second World War, there was a significant increase in teen marriage. During the 1940s, nearly 12 percent of teenage girls between the ages of 15 and 19 years old had been married. This number increased to over 17 percent by the 1950s.

1960s 
 More teen girls were getting married than boys. A study found that 32.1 percent of teen girls at ages 18–19 were married while only 8.9 percent of teen boys got married.

1970s 
 Fewer teenagers got married. Only 11.9 percent of girls and 4.1 percent of boys ages 15–19 got married in 1970.

Religious aspect
The article Religious Heritage and Teenage Marriage suggests that many religions, such as Pentecostalism, Fundamentalist Christianity, and other institutionalized sects, give a message that leads both parents and teens to view early marriage as the only acceptable means of culminating romantic relationships within the religion. It also became the tradition to the first generation.

US state listing of teen marriage license laws

 Alabama
 Under 18 applicants need certified copy of birth certificate, both parents must be present with identification, or if you have a legal guardian they must be present with a court order and identification. If one or both parents are deceased, proper evidence of such must be provided.
 Alaska
 Under 18 applicants need certified copy of birth certificate, both parents must be present with identification, or if you have a legal guardian they must be present with a court order and identification.
 Arizona
 If applicant is under the age of 16, either a notarised parental consent form is needed, or the parents must accompany the applicant, present the proper identification, and sign the parental consent form in front of the clerk issuing the license.
 If applicant is age 16 – 17 one of the following documents showing proof of age is needed:
 certified copy of birth certificate
 current driver's license
 state or military I.D. card
 or current passport
 If applicant is age 16 or under, a court order is also necessary.
 Arkansas
 Under 18 requires consent of both sets of parents.
 California
 If either the bride or groom is under 18, at least one of the minor's parents, or legal guardian, must appear with the couple. Certified copies of birth certificates are required. The couple must also schedule an appointment with a counselor and then appear before a superior court judge.
 Colorado
 If applicant is 16 or 17, consent of both parents (or parent having legal custody), or guardian, or judicial approval is necessary.
 Before August of 2019, if applicant is under 16, a Judicial Court Order along with parental consent is necessary.
 Connecticut
 If applicant is under the age of 18 written consent of the parent or guardian is required and under the age of 16 the Judge of probate must endorse with written consent on the license.

Results and consequences

Consequences
According to the book of Eleanor H. Ayer, another situation that could lead teenagers to an early marriage is often unprotected sex, which can lead to pregnancy. Other factors that could also lead to early marriage are love, lust, fear of losing their partner, abuse, extreme parental control, sexual harassment and broader family difficulties.

Results
One in three teen marriages ends in divorce by the age of 25. Additionally, according to Bob and Sheri Stitof, "marriages and divorce rates have increased by 68 percent since 1995. Also, one out of every four teenagers have parents that are divorced."

See also
Age of consent
Child marriage
List of youngest wives
Marriageable age
Teenage pregnancy

References

External links
Teenagers: Marriages, Divorces, Parenthood, and Mortality CDC, U.S. Government
Early Teen Marriage and Future Poverty Demography, August 2010
Teenage marriage and births in developed countries OECD Countries

Types of marriage
Marriage age